The 2006–07 Australian Athletics Championships was the 85th edition of the national championship in outdoor track and field for Australia. It was held from 9–11 March 2007 at the Queensland Sport and Athletics Centre in Brisbane. It served as a selection meeting for Australia at the 2007 World Championships in Athletics. Long-distance events took place separately: the 10,000 metres events was held at the Zatopek 10K on 14 December 2006 at Lakeside Stadium in Melbourne while the 5000 metres events were held at the Melbourne Track Classic on 2 March 2007.

Medal summary

Men

Women

References

External links 
 Athletics Australia website

2007
Australian Athletics Championships
Australian Championships
Athletics Championships
Sports competitions in Brisbane
2000s in Brisbane